Peters is a census-designated place in San Joaquin County, California. The 2020 United States census reported Peters' population was 472, which is lower from 672 at The 2010 United States census.

Geography
According to the United States Census Bureau, the CDP covers an area of 2.5 square miles (6.6 km), 99.76% of it land and 0.24% of it water.

Demographics
The 2010 United States Census reported that Peters had a population of 672. The racial makeup of Peters was 532 (79.2%) White, 7 (1.0%) African American, 15 (2.2%) Native American, 20 (3.0%) Asian, 0 (0.0%) Pacific Islander, 60 (8.9%) from other races, and 38 (5.7%) from two or more races. Hispanic or Latino of any race were 153 persons (22.8%).

The Census reported that 672 people (100% of the population) lived in households, 0 (0%) lived in non-institutionalized group quarters, and 0 (0%) were institutionalized.

There were 207 households, out of which 82 (39.6%) had children under the age of 18 living in them, 150 (72.5%) were opposite-sex married couples living together, 21 (10.1%) had a female householder with no husband present, 8 (3.9%) had a male householder with no wife present.  There were 9 (4.3%) unmarried opposite-sex partnerships, and 2 (1.0%) same-sex married couples or partnerships. 19 households (9.2%) were made up of individuals, and 6 (2.9%) had someone living alone who was 65 years of age or older. The average household size was 3.25.  There were 179 families (86.5% of all households); the average family size was 3.43.

The population was spread out, with 170 people (25.3%) under the age of 18, 64 people (9.5%) aged 18 to 24, 135 people (20.1%) aged 25 to 44, 229 people (34.1%) aged 45 to 64, and 74 people (11.0%) who were 65 years of age or older.  The median age was 41.5 years. For every 100 females, there were 92.0 males.  For every 100 females age 18 and over, there were 88.0 males.

The homeowner vacancy rate was 1.6%; the rental vacancy rate was 4.5%.  613 people (91.2% of the population) lived in owner-occupied housing units and 59 people (8.8%) lived in rental housing units.

References

Census-designated places in San Joaquin County, California
Census-designated places in California